Oreonectes daqikongensis is a species of cyprinid of the genus Oreonectes. It inhabits caves in Guangxi, China. First described by Wu in 2013, it has not been evaluated on the IUCN Red List and is considered harmless to humans.

References

Cyprinid fish of Asia
Freshwater fish of China
Fish described in 2013